Big Run, Pennsylvania may refer to:

Big Run, Centre County, Pennsylvania
Big Run, Dauphin County, Pennsylvania
Big Run, Jefferson County, Pennsylvania